Stefan Bergtoft (born 24 March 1979) is a Swedish former professional footballer who played as a midfielder. He played in the Allsvenskan for Djurgårdens IF.

Honours
Djurgårdens IF
 Allsvenskan: 2002, 2003, 2005

References

External links
 
 

1979 births
Living people
Association football midfielders
Swedish footballers
Allsvenskan players
Spånga IS players
Djurgårdens IF Fotboll players
IF Brommapojkarna players